Clystea carnicauda is a moth of the subfamily Arctiinae. It was described by Arthur Gardiner Butler in 1876. It is found in Trinidad and Brazil.

References

Clystea
Moths described in 1876